WHVO (1480 AM) and WKDZ (1110 AM) are a pair of radio stations simulcasting an oldies format. Licensed to Hopkinsville, Kentucky, United States, WHVO serves the Clarksville-Hopkinsville area. WKDZ is licensed to Cadiz, Kentucky. The stations are currently owned by Ham Broadcasting Co., Inc. and feature news programming from Fox News Radio. WKDZ is a daytime-only radio station, while WHVO broadcasts 24 hours a day.

History

History of WHVO 
The station was assigned the call letters WKOA upon signing on on September 19, 1954, under the license of Pennyrile Broadcasting Company. It was a middle-of-the-road (MOR format) in the 1970s, and then a big band/oldies format during the mid-1980s. The station's callsigns changed to WYKH on August 1, 1986. On December 14, 1987, the station changed its call sign to WQKS. WQKS was acquired by the station's current owner, Ham Broadcasting, in October 1995. The current WHVO callsigns came on May 16, 2000.

History of WKDZ (AM) 
WKDZ (AM) signed on the air on April 8, 1966.
It signed on the air with the performance of "The Star-Spangled Banner" by the Trigg County High School band. The first song played on WKDZ was "These Boots Are Made for Walkin'" by Nancy Sinatra.

Ham Broadcasting acquired WKDZ-AM on January 22, 1991.

Recent history 
In the early 2010s, Ham Broadcasting signed on two low-powered translators for the purpose of simulcasting WHVO's programming onto the FM dial.

Programming

Sports programming 
In addition to its usual oldies music, WHVO and WKDZ-AM is the broadcaster of the Fort Campbell High School Falcons football team.

The only time WKDZ-AM does not simulcast with WHVO is when WKDZ-AM, alone, also serves as a UK Sports Network affiliate broadcasting Kentucky Wildcats women's basketball alone, but also simulcasts football and men's basketball broadcasts with WKDZ-FM. WHOP-AM is the other UK Sports Network station that broadcasts all three kinds of sports broadcasts in the Clarksville/Hopkinsville area.

Station programming schedule
 Hoptown This Morning – weekdays 6-9 a.m.
 Mid-Days with Tony Winfield – weekdays 9 a.m.-12 Noon and 1-3 p.m.
 Live Afternoon Drive with Kim Allen – weekdays 3-5 p.m.
 Original Rock 'n Roll with Tom Rogers – weeknights after 6 p.m. Features rock and roll hits that were first heard on the station (as WKOA) when they were first played.

News operation
WHVO/WKDZ, along with WKDZ-FM, boasts their own news operation. The one-hour newscasts, branded as News Edge, are broadcast at 12 Noon and 5:00 p.m. Central Time, and are simulcast over all three Ham Broadcasting-owned stations. Hourly national news updates on WHVO/WKDZ are provided by Fox News Radio, and are aired at the top of each hour.

References

External links
WHVO website 
WKDZ Sports 

 

HVO
Oldies radio stations in the United States
Radio stations established in 1954
Hopkinsville, Kentucky
HVO
1954 establishments in Kentucky
Cadiz, Kentucky